I'll Bury You Tomorrow is a 2002 low-budget independent horror film written and directed by Alan Rowe Kelly produced by New Millennium Pictures, starring Zoë Daelman Chlanda, Bill Corry, and Katherine O'Sullivan. The film premiered in West Paterson, New Jersey on June 17, 2002 and was released in DVD format on January 31, 2006.

I'll Bury You Tomorrow was filmed at Garrett Mountain Reservation in West Paterson, New Jersey.

Plot
Dolores Finley (Zoë Daelman Chlanda) is a deranged young woman that appears suddenly and asks to work at Beech's Funeral Home, the local mortuary for the dying rural town of Port Oram. The Beechs find her work and Dolores begins her job, but soon shows that she is a necrophiliac. However Nettie Beech (Katherine O'Sullivan) sees her dead daughter in Dolores and opts to try to keep her around at all costs.

Cast
Zoë Daelman Chlanda as Dolores Finley
Bill Corry as Percival Beech
Katherine O'Sullivan as Nettie Beech
Jerry Murdock as Jake Geraldi
Kristen Overdurf as Ellen Gallagher
Renee West as Tina Clark
Alan Rowe Kelly as Corey Nichols
P.J. Mehaffey as Eddie Gallagher
Michael Valentino as Train station attendant
Tina Kay as Mrs. Clark
Sandra Schaller as Sandra Clark
Karenann Sinocchi as Edwina Wilkes
Austin Sears as Dr. Gross
Rick Zahn as Client / Lt. Scallpone
Mia Demarco as Shana, the stripper

Reception and legacy
Critical reception has been polarized. Bloody Disgusting gave I'll Bury You Tomorrow three and a half skulls, calling the film "a fun and fierce look back at what was right about horror in the seventies". The review from DVD Verdict was more negative and they stated that they "really tried to like" the film but that "it is deficient in too many areas". JoBlo's Arrow in the Head reviewer also panned the film overall, criticizing it for being "painfully executed" and that it was "the cinematic equivalent of a cheese-grater to the nuts".

The film was mentioned in relation to a court case related to necrophilia, where one of the defendants stated that he had wanted to recreate one of the film's scenes where the main character was dancing with a corpse.

References

External links
 
 

2002 films
2002 drama films
American independent films
2002 horror films
Films shot in New Jersey
2000s English-language films
2000s American films